Jefferson High School (often referred to as "Lafayette Jefferson" or "Lafayette Jeff" or "Jeff") is a high school located in Lafayette, Indiana, United States and administered by the Lafayette School Corporation.  Its mascot is the Broncho and its school colors are red and black.

History
In a meeting held February 10, 1910, Lafayette's school board decided to proceed with construction of a new school to replace the aging and inadequate Lafayette High School at Sixth and Columbia. The new school, a three-story brick building to be named Jefferson High School, was erected in the block between Ninth, Tenth, Elizabeth and Cincinnati Streets.  Jefferson opened its doors to students in January 1912 and was formally dedicated April 2.  The old high school building at Sixth and Columbia became a vocational school, with classes beginning July 1, 1913.

By the early 1960s, Lafayette's growing population prompted the board to consider either expanding the current school building or constructing a new facility.  In 1965 they settled on the latter, and in 1966 a  section of land around the Pythian Home on South 18th Street was purchased to accommodate the project.  The new Jefferson High School was dedicated May 24, 1970.  The old Jeff building on North Ninth Street served from 1970 to 1982 as Tippecanoe Junior High School (Chargers) and was later occupied by Ivy Tech Community College; most recently it has been converted to apartments for the elderly.  The building also served as the annex to local charter elementary school, New Community School, from 2009–2013.

Arts
Construction on the Rohrman Center for the Performing Arts completed in 2008 and includes additional practice and performance rooms for the school's orchestra, bands, and choirs. They have three orchestras; Allegro, Maestoso, and Cantabile. With Cantabile being the highest orchestra. Choirs include the First Edition mixed show choir, the Expressions girls show choir, the top ranked concert choir Varsity Singers, A Cappella, the all inclusive mixed show choir, CSN, which stands for Chorale Sine Nomine (or the choir with no name) is the all-male choir, Accents is the all-female beginners choir, and there are also various after school singing groups that perform at various events. Lafayette Jefferson Marching Band competes around the state during the regular season and travels across the continent for special performances, including the 1988 Winter Olympics in Calgary, Alberta.

Publications
The yearbook (The Nautilus) and the newspaper (The Booster) have both won numerous awards for their achievements in the journalistic world. The school also jointly operates with Purdue University the ESports@Jeff program to provide videos, statistics and other content wirelessly during athletic events, and operates STRIVE, a community service organization that helps Make a Wish Foundation, Habitat for Humanity and other charitable groups. Among Jefferson High School's programs are JEFF 92 (WJEF), a student-operated radio station broadcasting since 1972.

Athletics
Scheumann Stadium, a multipurpose football/track/soccer facility, opened in 2004. The school is a part of the North Central Conference with Harrison and McCutcheon which are also located in the Lafayette/West Lafayette area.

Sports offered at Jeff include:

Baseball (boys)
State champs - 1969, 1973
Basketball (boys & girls)
Boys state champs - 1916,1948, 1964
Bowling (boys & girls)
Cross country (boys & girls)
Football (boys)
Golf (boys & girls)
Boys state champs - 1932, 1977, 1978, 1987
Girls state champs - 1979, 1983, 1984
Gymnastics (girls)
Soccer (boys & girls)
Softball (girls)
Swimming (boys & girls)
Girls state champs - 1975
Tennis (boys & girls)
Boys state champs - 1975
Track & field (boys & girls)
Volleyball (girls)
Wrestling (boys)

Baseball is played at Loeb Stadium.

Notable alumni

William Afflis, football player, Green Bay Packers, and professional wrestler known as Dick the Bruiser
Ray Ewry, 8-time Olympic Gold Medalist in Track and Field (1900, 1904, 1908)
Dustin Keller, football player, currently with the Miami Dolphins, formerly with the New York Jets
Adam Kennedy, actor and author, old football field was named after his dad, Jack Kennedy
Brian Lamb, founder of C-SPAN, 1959 grad
Chukie Nwokorie, football player, Indianapolis Colts and Green Bay Packers
Axl Rose, co-founder and singer for Guns N' Roses
Izzy Stradlin, co-founder and rhythm guitarist for Guns N' Roses
William Burgess Powell, (class of 1967) better known as Benjaman Kyle, amnesia victim
Ron Alting, a member of the Indiana State Senate representing the 22nd district, serving Tippecanoe County; graduate of Purdue University

See also
 List of high schools in Indiana

References

External links
 Official website

Educational institutions established in 1912
Public high schools in Indiana
Schools in Tippecanoe County, Indiana
Buildings and structures in Lafayette, Indiana
Purdue Boilermakers men's basketball
1912 establishments in Indiana